Billboard Top Rock'n'Roll Hits: 1962 is a compilation album released by Rhino Records in 1988, featuring 10 hit recordings from 1962.

The album includes eight songs that reached the top of the Billboard Hot 100 chart. The remaining two tracks both reached the Hot 100's Top 5, with "The Wanderer" coming in at No. 2 and "Palisades Park" peaking at No. 3. The 1993 re-issue replaced the track "Big Girls Don't Cry" by the 4 Seasons with "Green Onions", a No. 3 song by Booker T & the M.G.'s, thus bringing the number of chart toppers down to seven on this release. The album was certified Gold by the RIAA on July 16, 1996.

Track listing
Track information and credits taken from the album's liner notes.

References

1988 compilation albums
Billboard Top Rock'n'Roll Hits albums